Henry Lloyd-Hughes (born 11 August 1985) is an English actor. He is known for his roles in Harry Potter and the Goblet of Fire (2005), Unrelated (2007), The Inbetweeners (2008–2010), Miliband of Brothers (2010), Weekender (2011), Anna Karenina (2012), Parade's End (2012), and Indian Summers (2015). As of 2018 he voices Flynn Fairwind in World of Warcraft: Battle for Azeroth. In 2021, he appeared as Sherlock Holmes in the Netflix series, The Irregulars.

Personal life 
Lloyd-Hughes was born in 1985 in the United Kingdom, the son of actress Lucy Appleby (A Stitch in Time - 1963) and Timothy Lloyd-Hughes, a long-time senior executive with Deutsche Bank. He has two younger brothers, record executive Theo Lloyd-Hughes and actor Ben Lloyd-Hughes. Both Henry and Ben acted in Miliband of Brothers. Fred Macpherson, lead singer of the band Spector, and formerly of Les Incompétents and Ox.Eagle.Lion.Man, is his cousin.

Hughes and his family are all supporters of west London football club Queens Park Rangers.

Career
Lloyd-Hughes first appeared in the TV series Murphy's Law in 2004 before playing Roger Davies in the 2005 film Harry Potter and the Goblet of Fire. He then appeared in Joanna Hogg's film Unrelated in 2007 alongside Tom Hiddleston.

From 2008–2010 he played school bully Mark Donovan in the British sitcom The Inbetweeners. He reprised the role in the film The Inbetweeners Movie in 2011. In 2010, he portrayed former British Labour Party politician David Miliband in the TV film documentary Miliband of Brothers.

In 2011, he starred in the film Dimensions as Stephen, a brilliant young scientist who lives in England in the 1920s. The same year, he appeared in the film Weekender about the 1990 Manchester rave scene.

In the 2012 epic romantic drama film Anna Karenina, he played Burisov alongside Keira Knightley and Aaron Taylor-Johnson. In 2013, he starred in the film Hello Carter with Jodie Whittaker.

Lloyd-Hughes played Charles Bovary in the drama film Madame Bovary with Mia Wasikowska in the title role and which was released in 2014.

Theatre
Lloyd-Hughes has appeared in numerous theatre productions, including Rope, The Miracle, Punk Rock, and The Changeling.

In 2012, he starred as Dimitri Mitropoulos in the play Posh, which played at the Duke of York’s Theatre. Michael Billington of The Guardian said of Lloyd-Hughes's performance that he "impresses as a wealthy Greek who aims to be more English than the English".

Filmography

Film

Television

Theatre

Radio

Video games

References

External links

21st-century English male actors
1985 births
Living people
English male television actors
English male stage actors
English male film actors
English male radio actors
English male voice actors
Male actors from London
People from Westminster
People educated at St Paul's School, London